Anthony Lawrence (born 1 February 1946) is a Canadian former soccer player who competed at the 1976 Summer Olympics. 

In 1970, Lawrence played in the Toronto and District Soccer League with Toronto Emerald. Lawrence played in the National Soccer League in 1971 with Toronto Ukraina. He re-signed with Ukraina for the 1972 season. In 1976, he signed with the Serbian White Eagles. After a pay dispute with the White Eagles he was granted his release from his contract. He played with league rivals Toronto Italia for the remainder of the 1976 season.

References

External links
 

1946 births
Living people
Footballers from Greater London
English emigrants to Canada
Canadian soccer players
Olympic soccer players of Canada
Serbian White Eagles FC players
Footballers at the 1976 Summer Olympics
Canadian National Soccer League players
Association football midfielders
Toronto Italia players
Toronto Ukrainians players